Brookside is a village in Sri Lanka. It is located within the Central Province. It is home to 1,115 people, primarily those of Tamil descent, as well a smaller population of Sinhalese people.

History
The village was established in 1848 by the British. The village is the site of Brookside Estate, a tea farm.

See also
List of towns in Central Province, Sri Lanka

References

Populated places in Nuwara Eliya District